Guise is a commune in the Aisne department in Hauts-de-France in northern France. The city was the birthplace of the noble family of Guise, Dukes of Guise, who later became Princes of Joinville.

Population

Sights
The remains of the medieval castle of Guise, the seat of the Dukes of Guise, is within the commune.

Economy
Guise is the agricultural centre of the northern area of Aisne.

Miscellaneous
Guise was the birthplace of Camille Desmoulins (1760–1794), a journalist and politician who played an important part in the French Revolution, and that of Jeanne Macherez who was a heroine during the World War I.

It expressed many of his ideas about developing social sympathy through improved housing and services for workers and their families, influenced by the ideas of the philosopher Charles Fourier. In 1880 Godin created a cooperative association by which the workers owned and managed the complex. This continued until 1968.

On the 29th of August 1914  the Battle of St. Quentin (1914) was fought in and around the town. A memorial in Guise celebrates this event.

See also
 House of Guise
 Communes of the Aisne department

References

Thiérache
Communes of Aisne
Aisne communes articles needing translation from French Wikipedia